Isabella Grimaldi  (15?? – 1583), was Lady of Monaco by marriage to Honoré I, Lord of Monaco.   

Isabella was the daughter of Giovanni Battista Grimaldi, Lord of Montaudion, and Maddalena Pallavicini.  She was the niece of Etienne (Stephen) Grimaldi (d. 1561), who was the regent of Honoré I during his minority (1532-1540) and continued to be the de facto ruler of Monaco until his death, and the marriage between Isabella and Honoré I was arranged by Etienne.   The marriage took place in 1545.  She was widowed in 1581.

Issue 
Charles (26 January 1555 – 17 May 1589)
François (1557–1586)
Horace  (1558–1559)
Hercules (24 September 1562 – 21 November 1604)

References

 Michel-Yves Mourou, Princesses de Monaco, Editions du Rocher, Monaco, 2010. 

1583 deaths
16th-century births
Isabella
Princesses of Monaco
People of Ligurian descent